Yannis M'Bemba (born 1 July 2001) is a French professional footballer who plays as a centre-back for  club Le Puy on loan from Nantes.

Early life 
Yannis M'Bemba was born in Amiens, in a family with Gabonese and Congolese origins, growing up in Amiens while his mother worked in Paris.

Club career 
Having started his career at Amiens SC as a 9-year-old, M'Bemba quickly moved to Nantes, where his father was working, joining FC Nantes academy as an under-11.

Having progressed from the youth teams to the reserve team, he signed his first professional contract with the club in April 2021.

After making several appearances on the bench as an unused substitute in both Ligue 1 and Coupe de France, the young defender made his professional debut for FC Nantes on the 14 January 2022, replacing Sébastien Corchia in a 2–1 away Ligue 1 loss against Nice.

On 1 July 2022, M'Bemba joined Le Puy in Championnat National on loan for the 2022–23 season.

International career 
Having made the pre-selections for France youth teams in his early years, M'Bemba is also eligible for Gabon and Congo-Brazzaville as per his origins.

References

External links

2001 births
Living people
French footballers
French sportspeople of Gabonese descent
French sportspeople of Republic of the Congo descent
Association football defenders
Sportspeople from Amiens
FC Nantes players
Le Puy Foot 43 Auvergne players
Ligue 1 players
Championnat National 2 players
Black French sportspeople
Footballers from Hauts-de-France